"Back Door Santa" is a funk-style song recorded by Clarence Carter, which Atlantic Records released as a single in 1968.  In an artist biography, it is described as "a superbly funky Christmas single" and "raunchy". The song was included on an Atco various artists compilation album Soul Christmas (1968).

"Back Door Santa" has been recorded by several artists and Run-D.M.C. sampled it for "Christmas in Hollis". The lyrics include:

References

1968 songs
1968 singles
2005 singles
American Christmas songs
Atlantic Records singles
Songs written by Clarence Carter
Songs about Santa Claus
Clarence Carter songs